Charles Andrew Krueger (January 28, 1937 – February 5, 2021) was an American professional football player who was a defensive tackle for 15 seasons in the National Football League (NFL), all with the San Francisco 49ers. He played college football at Texas A&M, where he was a two-time All-American. He is a member of several halls of fame, including the Texas A&M Athletics Hall of Fame, College Football Hall of Fame, San Francisco 49ers Hall of Fame, National Football Foundation Hall of Fame, and the Texas Sports Hall of Fame.

Early life
Born and raised in Caldwell, Texas, Krueger was the second oldest of eight children. His family was poor; all the boys helped out in their father's mattress factory business. When he was 12, Kruger started playing football at halfback, but he soon grew in size to be more fit as a lineman. As a sophomore at Caldwell High School, he weighed 190 pounds and was 6 feet 2 inches tall. He received college football offers from Texas A&M, Rice, and Texas, and after being convinced by new Aggies head coach Bear Bryant, decided to play for Texas A&M.

His younger brother, Rolf Krueger, also played college football at Texas A&M and in the NFL.

College career
Krueger played college football at Texas A&M. Under head coach Bear Bryant, his teammates included 1957 Heisman Trophy winner John David Crow, future NFL All-Pro linebacker and coach Jack Pardee, and future Aggie coach Gene Stallings. Krueger received All-Southwest Conference (SWC) and All-American honors for the 1956 and 1957 seasons. He was part of the 1956 Aggies team that won the SWC championship. After his senior season, he played as captain of the 1958 College All-Star team, which defeated the Detroit Lions 35–19.

Krueger was inducted into the Texas A&M Athletics Hall of Fame in 1972 and the College Football Hall of Fame in 1983. He was also included in the SWC 50-year team which covered the 1919–68 seasons.

NFL career
Krueger was selected ninth overall in the 1958 NFL Draft by the San Francisco 49ers. He played defensive tackle for the team until his retirement in 1973. He was selected to the Associated Press All-Pro second-team in 1960 and 1965, and the UPI All-Pro honorable mention team in 1966.

Krueger wore number 70 and his number was retired by the 49ers. Nicknamed the "Textbook Tackle," his defensive teammates included Pro Football Hall of Fame members Dave Wilcox at linebacker and Jimmy Johnson at cornerback. He was one of the last linemen in the NFL to wear a two-bar "quarterback" facemask.  His brother Rolf (b.1946) was also an NFL player with the St. Louis Cardinals and the 49ers, where the two played together in 1972 and 1973.

Krueger's 15-year tenure with the 49ers is tied with Len Rohde for fourth in team history, behind John Brodie, Jerry Rice, and Jimmy Johnson.

Krueger was inducted into the National Football Foundation Hall of Fame in 1983, and the 49ers Hall of Fame in 2009.

After retirement
At age 51 in 1988, Krueger was awarded more than $2.3 million in damages stemming from a lawsuit against the San Francisco 49ers. The judge found that Krueger received repeated anesthetic injections during his NFL career so that he could continue to play in spite of significant knee injuries. The decision found that the 49ers were not truthful with Krueger regarding the seriousness of his injuries, which left him with severe chronic pain after his playing days.

From 1960 to his death, Krueger lived in Clayton, California where he was involved with charitable organizations. He suffered health problems in his later years that prevented him from enjoying the outdoors. In 2014, he was inducted into the Texas Sports Hall of Fame.

He died at the age of 84 on February 5, 2021, following heart and kidney failure, eight days after his birthday. He was survived by his wife of 48 years, Kristin Adler Krueger.

References

External links
Texas A&M Athletics – Hall of Fame – Charlie Krueger

1937 births
2021 deaths
American football defensive ends
American football defensive tackles
National Football League players with retired numbers
Texas A&M Aggies football players
San Francisco 49ers players
Western Conference Pro Bowl players
College Football Hall of Fame inductees
Caldwell High School (Caldwell, Texas) alumni
People from Caldwell, Texas
Players of American football from Texas